Calle nueva was a Spanish TV soap opera which was aired in Televisión Española between 1997 and 2000.

Plot
The series tells the story of human relationships that develop between the residents of a poor neighborhood of any Spanish city. In which the characters move in and out of the plot, the story opens with the arrival on Calle Nueva of Lucía, a woman and mother of a family touched by personal tragedy following the arrest of her husband Estéban. From the second season, the spotlight will fall on Susana, an executive who recently arrived from New York City.

Cast

References

Spanish television soap operas
1997 Spanish television series debuts
2000 Spanish television series endings
1990s Spanish drama television series
2000s Spanish drama television series
La 1 (Spanish TV channel) network series